Inanidrilus fijiensis is a species of annelid worm.

References 

fijiensis
Taxa named by Christer Erséus